At the 1924 Summer Olympics in Paris, ten events in shooting were contested.  These would be the last Games in which team events were part of the Olympic shooting program. The competitions were held from 23 June 1924 to 9 July 1924 at the shooting ranges at Versailles, Reims, Camp de Châlons (Mourmelon), and Issy-les-Moulineaux.

Medal summary

Notes:

For the team free rifle the IOC medal database lists also Léon Johnson and André Parmentier as silver medalists for France; and L. H. Clermont and C. Dupre as bronze medalists for Haiti, but all these shooters never participated in this competition.
For the team running deer, single shots the IOC medal database lists also Hans Nordvik and Oluf Wesmann-Kjær as gold medalists for Norway; and Karl Richter and Karl-Gustaf Svensson as silver medalists for Sweden, but all these shooters never participated in this competition.
For the team running deer, double shots the IOC medal database lists also John Faunthorpe and John O'Leary as gold medalists for Great Britain; Hans Nordvik and Oluf Wesmann-Kjær as silver medalists for Norway; and Edward Benedicks and Karl-Gustaf Svensson as bronze medalists for Sweden, but all these shooters never participated in this competition.
For the team trap the IOC medal database lists all six team members as medalists. The shooters below the line were the weakest of their teams and their scores did not count for the team score.

Participating nations
A total of 258 sport shooters from 27 nations competed at the Paris Games:

Medal table

References

External links
 

 
1924 Summer Olympics events
1924
Olympics
Olympics